Robert Punkenhofer (born July 7, 1965, in Austria) His career intertwines art, design and architecture as well as international business development. He currently serves as the Austrian Trade Commissioner in Barcelona, a job he has also performed in Mexico City, Berlin and New York City.

Education 
Punkenhofer was awarded a doctorate in 1991 and LL.M specialized in international comparative law at the Karl Franzens University of Graz, Austria. He made his postgraduate studies at the Law Faculty at the Venezuelan University Universidad Católica Andres Bello in Caracas. Two years later he attended New York University and earned a Master of Arts degree in Arts Administration specialized in museum management. In addition he has been part of the Guggenheim Foundation's internship program, worked at Exit Art and the Lycée Honoré Romane in France as a language assistant.

Career 
Punkenhofer  is the Founder and managing director of ART&IDEA since 1995, an agency that organizes contemporary art, design, architecture, and fashion programs internationally. Since its inception, ART & IDEA has hosted more than 100 exhibitions around the world.

Teaching 
Punkenhofer teaches as guest professor at New York University in the International Leadership Program in Visual Arts Management (ILPVAM)  and is a member of the International Advisory Board of Princeton University in the Program in Latin American Studies.

Publications 
Building an Island Vito Acconci / Acconci Studio (book, Hatje Cantz, 2003)  

A Way Beyond Creative Industries (book, Folio Verlag, 2010, 

Art & Idea Anniversary Publication (book, Hatje Cantz, 2007)

Contributions to publications 
 Cities, Museums and Soft Power (book, The AAM Press, 2015,  
 The apexart Fellowship: An Experiment in Vertical Cultural Integration (book, Apexart Publishing, 2016, 
 American Playgrounds: Revitalizing Community Space (book, University Press of New England, 2005)

External links 
 Interview art week in German
 Interview for Informativos in Spanish: Entrevista a Robert Punkenhofer: "el austriaco es un diseño irónico; muy emocional" 
 Art Week 16

References 

1965 births
Living people